Jinan North railway station, or Jibei railway station is a planned railway station in Daqiao Subdistrict, Tianqiao District, Jinan, Shandong Province, China.

Jinan Metro
It will be served by Line 7 of the Jinan Metro. Construction of Metro Line 7 started on 14 December 2022.

References

Railway stations in Shandong